Sónia Moura (born 1 June 1972) is a Portuguese gymnast. She competed in five events at the 1988 Summer Olympics.

References

1972 births
Living people
Portuguese female artistic gymnasts
Olympic gymnasts of Portugal
Gymnasts at the 1988 Summer Olympics
Place of birth missing (living people)
20th-century Portuguese women